Trojan Warrior is a 2002 Australian comedy film directed by Salik Silverstein and starring Stan Longinidis. The film was released in the United States as Kick to the Head.

Premise
When a comical mob bag-man rats out the local mob boss, the bagman's cousin must rescue him from both the mob and the cops so he can testify at the grand jury.

Cast
 Stan Longinidis
 Arthur Angel
 John Brumpton
 Stephen Yates
 Mark 'Jacko' Jackson
 Terry Lim
 Sam Kay
 Roland Dantes
 Ziggy Crowe
 Henry Maas
 Danielle Barht
 Mark Brandon Read
 George Longinidis
 Dermott Brereton
 Julianne Armstrong
 John Barresi
 Big Bad Ralph
 Frank Di Ciero
 John Fox
 Marnie Franklin
 Gabriel Gate
 Mick Gauci
 Doug Hawkins
 Jordan Kelly
 Professor Yoland Lim
 Greg Matthews
 Nick Polites
 Naomi Robson
 Teresa Svoronos
 Wilbur Wilde
 Ross Wilson
 Frank Deaney
 Melissa Mom
 Mark Fong

Box office
Trojan Warrior grossed $88,059 at the box office in Australia.

See also
 Cinema of Australia

References

External links
 Australian Film Commission (Screen Australia) – Trojan Warrior
 

2002 films
2000s action comedy films
2000s crime comedy films
Australian action comedy films
Australian crime comedy films
2002 comedy films
2000s English-language films
2000s Australian films